Dehong Mangshi Airport  is an airport serving Mangshi in Dehong, Yunnan Province, China.  It was formerly called Mangshi Airport.

History
Mangshi Airport first opened in 1940 during Second Sino-Japanese War with a 1,900 meters runway. Some of P-40, C-46 and C-47 had landed here for military purpose. After 1945, the airport was deserted. In 1985, Dehong prefectural government suggested to reconstruct the airport. China central government agreed to the request in 1987. Reconstruction project started in 1988. Finally, the airport opened in 1990 with a 2,200 meters runway. China Southwest Airlines offered public flights between Mangshi and Kunming at that time.

In 2003, CAAC rename it to Dehong Mangshi Airport. The first round expend construction started in 2006 and finished in 2009. The terminal was renovated as a peacock shape, and two airbridges was built. Mangshi airport upgraded to an international airport in 2016, and the second round expend construction started. In 2018, the expend construction finished and the runway expanded to 2,600 meters. On 31 January 2019, Ruili Airlines opened the first international flight to Mandalay, Myanmar.

Airlines and destinations

See also
List of airports in the People's Republic of China
List of the busiest airports in the People's Republic of China

References

External links
 Yunnan Airport Group

Airports in Yunnan
Transport in Dehong Dai and Jingpo Autonomous Prefecture